Claude Peretti (24 February 1942 – 8 September 2020) was a French footballer who played as a right midfielder. He won the 1963 Coupe de France with AS Monaco FC.

Biography
Peretti played his youth years with his hometown team, OGC Nice, which won the championship in 1959. He joined AS Monaco FC in 1960, with which he won the Coupe Charles Drago in his first season and led the 1962-63 French Division 1. He then played for Olympique de Marseille before returning to Monaco for a brief stint in 1964. In 1965, he joined AC Ajaccio, which won the Ligue 2 championship in 1967. He retired in 1970.

Claude Peretti died on 8 September 2020 at the age of 78.

References

 
1942 births
2020 deaths
French footballers
AS Monaco FC players
Olympique de Marseille players
AC Ajaccio players
Association football midfielders